The Italian torpedo boat Lince was a   built for the Regia Marina in the late 1930s.
During the Second World War, Lince was involved in several naval actions before she was sunk in August 1943 by a British submarine.

Construction
Lince was built in the late inter-war period by CNQ, Fiume, one of the Alcione sub-group of the numerous Spica class of torpedo boats. She was laid down on 7 December 1936, launched 15 January 1938, and commissioned 1 April 1938.
Lince was armed with three 100mm guns in single mounts, and four 450mm torpedo tubes; she also had two depth charge throwers and equipment for laying mines.

The Spica class ships all bore astronomical names; Lince was named for the constellation Lynx, after the big cat of that name.

Service history
There she was involved in escort duties and actions in the war against Greece.

In January 1941 Lince, in company with Lupo, attacked British convoy AN14, en route to Piraeus. Despite the escort of three destroyers Lince was able to distract them while Lupo torpedoed the tanker Desmoulea, which was disabled for the rest of the war. Italian official sources, however, reported that the ship that assisted Lupo in the attack was actually the torpedo boat Libra.

In February,  Lince, again with Lupo, (and joined later by the destroyers Sella and Crispi) took part in the re-conquest of the island of Kastellorizo, which had been seized by British commandos.

In April Lince, in company with Libra and the destroyer Crispi, encountered Allied convoy GA 15 engaged in evacuating troops from Greece. Despite the strong escort Lince and her companions made a spirited attack, claiming several hits, though the Allied commander later reported no losses.

In February 1942 went to the aid of the tanker Lucania, which had been torpedoed, and, with Circe, took part in an anti-submarine hunt which resulted in the sinking of the British submarine Tempest.

In August Lince was assisting the freighter Iseo, which had been attacked by the British submarine Porpoise. Lince counter-attacked, resulting in damage to Porpoise which was forced to return to base.

In November Lince was badly damaged in an air attack off Tripoli, suffering the loss of her commander and many of the crew. She was able to dock in Tripoli for repairs, but with the retreat of the Afrika Korps towards the city her master received orders in January 1943 to scuttle the ship to avoid a capture. However her crew endeavoured to bring her home, arriving at Trapani despite Allied attacks at the end of the month.

In July Lince returned to escort duty, but was lost in August after she ran aground.

Fate
On 4 August 1943, en route from Taranto, Lince ran aground at Punta Alice, near Ciro Marina, Calabria. Despite efforts to re-float her, Lince was discovered on 28 August by the British submarine Ultor, and hit with two torpedoes. The ship was destroyed, though casualties were light as her crew had been evacuated, leaving only damage control parties.

Notes

References
 Robert Gardner, Conway's All the World's Fighting Ships 1922–1946 (1980) Conway Publishing : 
 Vincent O'Hara, The Struggle for the Middle Sea (2009) Conway Publishing :

External links
 Lince Marina Militare website

Lince
1938 ships
Ships sunk by British submarines
World War II shipwrecks in the Mediterranean Sea